Vista Alegre is a corregimiento in Arraiján District, Panamá Oeste Province, Panama with a population of 55,369 as of 2010. Its population as of 1990 was 11,801; its population as of 2000 was 39,097.

References

Corregimientos of Panamá Oeste Province